Thomas or Tom McBride may refer to:

 Thomas McBride (footballer) (born 1992), footballer from Derry, Northern Ireland
 Thomas A. McBride (1847–1930), American attorney and judge in Oregon
 Thomas George McBride (1867–1950), Progressive party member of the Canadian House of Commons
 Tom McBride (baseball) (1914–2001), professional baseball outfielder
 Tom McBride (actor) (1952–1995), American photographer, model, and actor
 Big Tom (Tom McBride, 1936–2018), Irish country music singer and musician

See also
Thomas MacBride (disambiguation)